Enid Borden is the founder, president and CEO of the National Foundation to End Senior Hunger (NFESH), formerly known as the Meals On Wheels Research Foundation.  As president and CEO, Borden frequently speaks to audiences about the issue and leads NFESH every day in its mission of engaging new partners to provide answers and create solutions that can end senior hunger.

Prior to leading NFESH, Borden was the president and CEO of the Meals On Wheels Association of America (MOWAA) for over 20 years.  Under Borden's direction, MOWAA grew from a little-known trade association to become a preeminent national charity. An outspoken advocate for those forgotten seniors she called "the hidden hungry,” she guided the organization through two decades of remarkable growth, increasing its annual budget more than tenfold and overseeing millions of dollars in grants allocated to MOWAA's member programs across the United States to support their efforts of providing nutritious meals to seniors in their local communities.

Prior to her tenure of MOWAA, Borden held several public affairs and policy positions in the public sector, including deputy commissioner for policy and external affairs at the Social Security Administration and director of public affairs of the then-Office of Human Development Services within the U. S. Department of Health and Human Services. She also has been a successful small business owner.

Borden served as an advisory board member of the Sesame Street Food Insecurity Advisory Committee and on the American Society of Association Executive's (ASAE) Key Philanthropic Organizations Committee (KPOC), which she chaired in 2008 and 2009.  She has also been a member of the CEO advisory committee of ASAE, a member of the nonprofit advisory board, a member of the board of trustees of Alfred University and the board of directors of the Visiting Nurse Associations of  America. Additionally, Borden has served on the faculty in the School of Graduate and Continuing Studies at Goucher College in Baltimore. Borden's work has earned her recognition in Who's Who in the Media and Communications and in the book “Everyday Heroes: 50 Americans Changing the World One Nonprofit at a Time”.

She earned her bachelor's degree from Alfred University, her master's degree from Adelphi University and pursued study through the John F. Kennedy School of Government of Harvard University.

References

Living people
Year of birth missing (living people)